James Keith Singleton Jr. (born January 27, 1939) is a senior United States district judge of the United States District Court for the District of Alaska.

Education and career

Born in Oakland, California, Singleton attended the University of California at Berkeley, earning an Artium Baccalaureus degree in 1961, and a Bachelor of Laws from the University of California at Berkeley, Boalt Hall School of Law in 1964. He was in private practice in Anchorage, Alaska until 1970, then served as a judge on the Alaska Superior Court from 1970 to 1980, and on the Alaska Court of Appeals from 1980 to 1990.

Federal judicial service

Singleton was nominated by President George H. W. Bush on January 24, 1990, to a seat on the United States District Court for the District of Alaska vacated by Judge James Martin Fitzgerald. Singleton was confirmed by the United States Senate on May 11, 1990, and received his commission on May 14, 1990. He served as Chief Judge of that court from 1995 to 2002, and assumed senior status on January 27, 2005.

References

Sources

1939 births
Living people
Lawyers from Oakland, California
Lawyers from Anchorage, Alaska
University of California, Berkeley alumni
UC Berkeley School of Law alumni
Alaska state court judges
Judges of the United States District Court for the District of Alaska
United States district court judges appointed by George H. W. Bush
20th-century American judges
Superior court judges in the United States
21st-century American judges